Charles Cameron Cherry (19 November 1872 – 2 September 1931) was a British born actor. He was born to James Frederick Cherry (died 1883) and his wife, Lady Emily Louisa Haworth-Leslie (died 1936) at Greenwich, Kent, England. His mother was a relation to Norman Leslie, 19th Earl of Rothes. He spent a large part of his career in the United States often as leading man to many beautiful star actresses i.e. Elsie de Wolfe, Maxine Elliott, Ethel Barrymore, Marie Doro and Elsie Ferguson.

He appeared in two silent motion pictures, The Mummy and the Hummingbird (1915) and Passers By (1916).

His sisters were Miriam Audrey Cherry (died 1954) (Mrs. Herbert Owen-Taylor) and Gladys Cherry (1881–1965) (Mrs. George O. S. Pringle), a Titanic survivor. His spouse was Grace Dudley.

References

External links

Charles Cherry: North American Theatre Online
portraits of Charles Cherry(University of Washington, Sayre collection)

1872 births
1931 deaths
Male actors from Kent
People from Greenwich
English male stage actors
English male film actors
English male silent film actors
20th-century English male actors